Igor Sijsling and Tim van Rijthoven were the defending champions but chose not to defend their title.

Dan Added and Albano Olivetti won the title after defeating Victor Vlad Cornea and Luis David Martínez 3–6, 6–1, [12–10] in the final.

Seeds

Draw

References

External links
 Main draw

Open de Tenis Ciudad de Pozoblanco - Doubles
2022 Doubles